"At Transformation" is a song by Canadian rock group The Tragically Hip. It was released in May 2012 as the lead single from their twelfth full-length studio album, Now for Plan A. A 90-second clip of the song premiered during the opening segment of Hockey Night in Canada on May 12, 2012. The song premiered in its entirety on May 16 on Toronto radio station CFNY-FM. The song was released to radio stations on May 17 and was officially released digitally on May 18, 2012.

Charts

References

2012 singles
2012 songs
The Tragically Hip songs
Universal Music Group singles
Song recordings produced by Gavin Brown (musician)
Songs written by Rob Baker (guitarist)
Songs written by Gord Downie